The 2007 elections to Nottingham City Council were held on 3 May 2007 to elect all 55 members to the council.

Overall result
A total of 55 councillors were elected from 20 wards in the city.

|}

Results by Ward

Arboretum

Aspley

Basford

Berridge

Bestwood

Bilborough

Bridge

Bulwell

Bulwell Forest

Clifton North

Clifton South

Dales

Dunkirk and Lenton

Leen Valley

Mapperley

Radford and Park

Sherwood

St Ann's

Wollaton East and Lenton Abbey

Wollaton West

References

External links
Full transcript of the 2007 results

2007
2007 English local elections
2000s in Nottingham